Shikhan (Şixan) is a rural locality (a village) in Urman-Bishkadaksky Selsoviet, Ishimbaysky District, Bashkortostan, Russia. The population was 11 as of 2010. There are 3 streets.

Geography 
Shikhan is located 16 km north of Ishimbay (the district's administrative centre) by road. Karayganovo is the nearest rural locality.

References 

Rural localities in Ishimbaysky District